Archips pulchra is a species of moth of the family Tortricidae. It is found in China (Heilongjiang), South Korea, Japan and Russia (Primorye).

The wingspan is 19.5–25 mm. There is one generation per year with adults on wing in July.

The larvae feed on Abies nephrolepis and Picea asperata. The species overwinters as a young larva. Pupation takes place in mid-June.

References

Moths described in 1879
Archips
Moths of Asia